Mad Locust Rising is an EP by the American heavy metal band Agent Steel, released in January 1986 by Combat Records. It was recorded at Indigo Ranch Studios in October 1985 in Malibu, California. The EP features a cover of the Judas Priest song "The Ripper". It is also included on the 1999 reissue of the 1987 album Unstoppable Force. Former bassist Mike Zaputil is credited on the album, but the bass tracks were actually recorded by George Robb, who was then fired after the recordings, while Zaputil joined in early 1986 from Letchen Grey.

Track listing

Personnel
John Cyriis - Vocals
Juan Garcia - Guitar
Bernie Versailles - Guitar
George Robb - Bass (Uncredited)
Mike Zaputil - Bass
Chuck Profus - Drums

Production
Barry Kobrin - Executive producer
Steve Sinclair - Executive producer
Chuck Johnson - Engineering
Carl Lange - Engineering
Tom Coyne - Mastering
Joe Leonard - Production coordination
Dan McConomy - Producer (additional)
John Cyriis - Cover concept
Gerald McLaughlin - Cover art
Bill Cassel - Photography
Edward J. Repka - Sleeve design

1986 EPs
Agent Steel albums
Combat Records albums